The Club de Fútbol Constructores de Gómez Palacio, commonly known as Constructores, was a Mexican football club based in Gómez Palacio. The club was founded in 2014, and played in the Serie B of Liga Premier. In 2019, the club was dissolved due to budget problems.

History
The team was founded in 2014 as a project belonging to the amateur sector of the Mexican Football Federation, in that year they won the Multiversity Cup, a school tournament. In the 2015–16 season the club entered the Third Division of Mexico, the last professional category in the country. In 2017 the team began to participate in the Second Division of Mexico, taking part in Serie B.

References 

Association football clubs established in 2014
2014 establishments in Mexico
Association football clubs disestablished in 2019
2019 disestablishments in Mexico
Liga Premier de México
Football clubs in Durango